The 2020–21 Formosa Taishin Dreamers season was the franchise's 4th season, its first season in the P. LEAGUE+ (PLG). The Dreamers are coached by Kyle Julius in his second year as head coach. The Dreamers play their home games at Changhua County Stadium and National Taiwan University of Sport Gymnasium.

On July 8, 2020, Blackie Chen stepped down as the team manager and announced the establishment of PLG. The Dreamers has become one of the four teams of the inaugural PLG season.

The Dreamers was sponsored by Taishin International Bank this season, renamed Formosa Taishin Dreamers.

On March 15, 2021, Tien Lei announced that this would be his final season.

Draft 
The P. LEAGUE+ (PLG) did not hold a draft in its first season.

Standings

Roster

Game log

Preseason 

|-style="background:#fcc;"
| 1 
| October 17 
| @Lioneers 
| L 80–87 
| Yang Chin-Min (23)
| Yang Chin-Min (11)
| Yang Chin-Min (5)
| Hsinchu County Stadium8,068
| 0–1
|-style="background:#cfc"
| 2
| October 18
| AirApe
| W 84–77
| Lin Chun-Chi (18)
| Wang Po-Chih (10)
| Lin Chun-Chi (6)
| Hsinchu County Stadium7,888
| 1–1
|-style="background:#cfc"
| 3
| November 7
| Lioneers
| W 122–104
| Jerran Young (38)
| Jerran Young (14)
| Anthony Tucker (5)
| Taipei Heping Basketball Gymnasium6,459
| 2–1
|-style="background:#cfc"
| 4
| November 8
| Braves
| W 95–87
| Tucker, Yang C. (24)
| Lee, Tien, Yang C. (7)
| Anthony Tucker (6)
| Taipei Heping Basketball Gymnasium6,606
| 3–1
|-style="background:#cfc"
| 5
| November 21
| @Pilots
| W 93–86
| Anthony Tucker (20)
| Lee Te-Wei (9)
| Anthony Tucker (8)
| National Taiwan University of Sport Gymnasium4,500
| 4–1
|-style="background:#fcc;"
| 6
| November 22
| Braves
| L 83–118
| Jerran Young (26)
| Jerran Young (11)
| Anthony Tucker (7)
| National Taiwan University of Sport Gymnasium4,700
| 4–2

Regular season 

|-style="background:#fcc;"
| 1
| December 19
| Braves
| L 86–89
| Yang Chin-Min (30)
| Jerran Young (9)
| Tucker, Yang S. (4)
| Changhua County Stadium5,881
| 0–1
|-style="background:#fcc;"
| 2
| December 20
| Pilots
| L 83–103
| Jerran Young (21)
| Jerran Young (10)
| Anthony Tucker (6)
| Changhua County Stadium3,689
| 0–2

|-style="background:#fcc;"
| 3
| January 3
| @Pilots
| L 100–104
| Anthony Tucker (42)
| Jerran Young (12)
| Yang Chin-Min (6)
| Taoyuan Arena3,862
| 0–3
|-style="background:#cfc"
| 4
| January 9
| @Lioneers
| W 95–87
| Anthony Tucker (41)
| Lee Te-Wei (12)
| Anthony Tucker (5)
| Hsinchu County Stadium5,798
| 1–3
|-style="background:#fcc;"
| 5
| January 16
| @Braves
| L 95–115
| Stephan Hicks (27)
| Stephan Hicks (18)
| Stephan Hicks (6)
| Taipei Heping Basketball Gymnasium7,000
| 1–4
|-style="background:#fcc;"
| 6
| January 17
| @Pilots
| L 86–90
| Anthony Tucker (22)
| Lee Te-Wei (12)
| Anthony Tucker (8)
| Taoyuan Arena0
| 1–5
|-style="background:#fcc;"
| 7
| January 23
| @Pilots
| L 84–89
| Jerran Young (20)
| Randall Walko (12)
| Yang S., Young (4)
| Taoyuan Arena0
| 1–6
|-style="background:#cfc"
| 8
| January 24
| @Lioneers
| W 92–81
| Anthony Tucker (29)
| Lee Te-Wei (15)
| Tucker, Young (3)
| Hsinchu County Stadium5,967
| 2–6
|-style="background:#cfc"
| 9
| January 30
| Lioneers
| W 103–92
| Anthony Tucker (39)
| Jerran Young (9)
| Jerran Young (5)
| Changhua County Stadium4,521 || 3–6
|-style="background:#fcc;"
| 10
| January 31
| Braves
| L 84–111
| Stephan Hicks (25)
| Stephan Hicks (16)
| Chen Jen-Jei (4)
| Changhua County Stadium4,867
| 3–7

|-style="background:#cfc"
| 11
| February 6
| Braves
| W 100–91
| Hicks, Young (27)
| Stephan Hicks (10)
| Yang Chin-Min (11)
| Changhua County Stadium4,280
| 4–7
|-style="background:#cfc"
| 12
| February 7
| Lioneers
| W 96–85
| Anthony Tucker (26)
| Tucker, Young (13)
| Kenneth Chien (5)
| Changhua County Stadium3,886
| 5–7
|-style="background:#cfc"
| 13
| February 21
| @Pilots
| W 102–99
| Anthony Tucker (42)
| Lee Te-Wei (11)
| Anthony Tucker (7)
| Taoyuan Arena1,500
| 6–7
|-style="background:#cfc"
| 14
| February 27
| Braves
| W 101–89
| Stephan Hicks (27)
| Lee Te-Wei (15)
| Jerran Young (5)
| Changhua County Stadium4,273
| 7–7
|-style="background:#cfc"
| 15
| February 28
| Pilots
| W 98–90
| Lin Chun-Chi (39)
| Jerran Young (12)
| Chien, Tucker (6)
| Changhua County Stadium3,876
| 8–7

|-style="background:#fcc;"
| 16
| March 6
| @Braves
| L 104–114
| Jerran Young (38)
| Stephan Hicks (16)
| Jerran Young (5)
| Taipei Heping Basketball Gymnasium6,888
| 8–8
|-style="background:#fcc;"
| 17
| March 13
| @Braves
| L 94–99
| Randall Walko (33)
| Kenneth Chien (10)
| Tucker, Young (5)
| Taipei Heping Basketball Gymnasium6,430
| 8–9
|-style="background:#fcc;"
| 18
| March 14
| @Lioneers
| L 105–112
| Anthony Tucker (41)
| Lee Te-Wei (10)
| Anthony Tucker (10)
| Hsinchu County Stadium5,893
| 8–10
|-style="background:#fcc;"
| 19
| March 20
| Lioneers
| L 87–99
| Anthony Tucker (24)
| Stephan Hicks (13)
| Anthony Tucker (5)
| National Taiwan University of Sport Gymnasium4,000
| 8–11
|-style="background:#cfc"
| 20
| March 21
| Pilots
| W 107–100
| Randall Walko (34)
| Jerran Young (14)
| Lin Chun-Chi (7)
| National Taiwan University of Sport Gymnasium3,976
| 9–11
|-style="background:#cfc"
| 21
| March 27
| @Lioneers
| W 99–91
| Lin Chun-Chi (32)
| Stephan Hicks (14)
| Yang Chin-Min (6)
| Hsinchu County Stadium7,078
| 10–11
|-style="background:#fcc;"
| 22
| March 28
| @Braves
| L 106–110
| Anthony Tucker (36)
| Tucker, Young (11)
| Anthony Tucker (10)
| Taipei Heping Basketball Gymnasium7,001
| 10–12

|-style="background:#fcc;"
| 23
| April 3
| Pilots
| L 95–106
| Stephan Hicks (33)
| Hicks, Morrison (10)
| Yang Shen-Yen (7)
| Changhua County Stadium5,100
| 10–13
|-style="background:#fcc;"
| 24
| April 4
| Lioneers
| L 100–108
| Anthony Tucker (41)
| Anthony Tucker (10)
| Anthony Tucker (12)
| Changhua County Stadium6,000 || 10–14

Regular season note 
 Due to the COVID-19 pandemic, the Taoyuan City Government and Taoyuan Pilots declared that the games in Taoyuan Arena would be played behind closed doors from January 16, 2021 to February 7, 2021.

Playoffs 

|-style="background:#cfc"
| 1
| April 23
| @Pilots
| W 102–63
| Stephan Hicks (27)
| Stephan Hicks (19)
| Lee Te-Wei (5)
| Taoyuan Arena2,977
| 1–0
|-style="background:#fcc;"
| 2
| April 25
| @Pilots
| L 86–91
| Stephan Hicks (21)
| Stephan Hicks (18)
| Anthony Tucker (6)
| Taoyuan Arena4,758
| 1–1
|-style="background:#fcc;"
| 3
| April 28
| Pilots
| L 79–82
| Stephan Hicks (21)
| Stephan Hicks (19)
| Yang C., Young (5)
| Changhua County Stadium3,612
| 1–2
|-style="background:#cfc"
| 4
| April 30
| Pilots
| W 103–74
| Stephan Hicks (39)
| Stephan Hicks (17)
| Lin, Young (8)
| Changhua County Stadium4,015
| 2–2
|-style="background:#cfc"
| 5
| May 2
| @Pilots
| W 93–91
| Jerran Young (42)
| Jerran Young (11)
| Hicks, Lee, Lin (5)
| Changhua County Stadium3,003
| 3–2

|-style="background:#cfc"
| 1
| May 7
| @Braves
| W 114–109
| Stephan Hicks (42)
| Stephan Hicks (17)
| Yang Chin-Min (10)
| Taipei Heping Basketball Gymnasium7,000
| 1–0
|-style="background:#fcc;"
| 2
| May 9
| @Braves
| L 82–106
| Stephan Hicks (19)
| Anthony Tucker (13)
| Anthony Tucker (10)
| Taipei Heping Basketball Gymnasium7,000
| 1–1
|-style="background:#fcc;"
| 3
| May 13
| Braves
| L 110–114 (OT)
| Stephan Hicks (31)
| Stephan Hicks (18)
| Lee Te-Wei (6)
| Changhua County Stadium0
| 1–2
|-style="background:#fcc;"
| 4
| May 15
| Taipei Fubon Braves
| L 115–90
| Stephan Hicks (33)
| Stephan Hicks (17)
| Kenneth Chien (8)
| Changhua County Stadium0
| 1–3

Playoffs note 
 Due to the COVID-19 pandemic, the league officials declared to change the location of Game 5 from Taoyuan Arena to Changhua County Stadium.

Finals note 
 Due to the COVID-19 pandemic, the league officials declared that Game 3 and Game 4 would be played behind closed doors and Game 5 to Game 7 would be cancelled.

Player Statistics 
<noinclude>

Regular season

Playoffs and Finals

 Reference：

Transactions

Overview

Free Agency

Re-signed

Additions

Subtractions

Awards

End-of-Season Awards

Players of the Month

Players of the Week

Notes

References 

Formosa Taishin Dreamers seasons
F